Romanzoffia californica is a species of flowering plant in the borage family known by the common name California mistmaiden. It is native to Oregon and northern California, where it grows in moist and wet habitat, such as coastal bluffs and mountain forests.

Romanzoffia californica grows erect to 40 centimeters tall from a network of hairy brown tubers. Around the base is a number of leaves with rounded, evenly lobed blades on petioles several centimeters long.

The inflorescence is a curving cyme of flowers, each on a small, erect pedicel. The flower has a funnel-shaped corolla which may just exceed a centimeter long, set in a calyx of pointed sepals. The corolla is white in color with a yellow throat. The fruit is a capsule up to a centimeter long.

References

External links

 Calflora Database: Romanzoffia californica (California mistmaiden,  California romanzoffia)
Jepson Manual eFlora (TJM2) treatment of Romanzoffia californica
USDA Plants Profile for Romanzoffia californica
UC Photos gallery of Romanzoffia californica

Hydrophylloideae
Flora of California
Flora of Oregon
Flora of the Klamath Mountains
Natural history of the California Coast Ranges
Natural history of the San Francisco Bay Area
Endemic flora of the United States
Taxa named by Edward Lee Greene
Flora without expected TNC conservation status